The 2004 United States presidential election in Maryland took place on November 2, 2004, and was part of the 2004 United States presidential election. Voters chose 10 representatives, or electors to the Electoral College, who voted for president and vice president.

Maryland was won by Democratic nominee John Kerry by a 12.98% margin of victory. Prior to the election, all twelve news organizations considered this a state Kerry would win, or otherwise considered as a safe blue state. The last Republican to carry the state in a presidential election was Bush's father George H. W. Bush in 1988. As of the 2020 election, this is the last time a Republican presidential candidate won more than 40% of the vote in Maryland, the only time a Republican presidential candidate received more than a million votes in Maryland, and the last time a Democratic presidential nominee has failed to both break 60% of the vote and win by less than a 15% margin in the Old Line State. This is also the only time since 1984 that Maryland shifted rightward compared to the previous election. Bush's 1,024,703 votes is the most received by a Republican presidential candidate in the state's history. Bush remains the last candidate of either party to win Kent County by a majority.

Primaries
 2004 Maryland Democratic presidential primary

Campaign

Predictions
There were 12 news organizations who made state-by-state predictions of the election. Here are their last predictions before election day.

 D.C. Political Report: Solid Democratic
 Associated Press: Solid Kerry
 CNN: Kerry
Cook Political Report: Solid Democratic
 Newsweek: Solid Kerry
New York Times: Solid Kerry
 Rasmussen Reports: Kerry
 Research 2000: Solid Kerry
Washington Post: Kerry
Washington Times: Solid Kerry
Zogby International: Kerry
 Washington Dispatch: Kerry

Polling
Kerry won every pre-election poll. The final 3 poll average showed Kerry leading 52% to 42%.

Fundraising
Bush raised $4,174,964. Kerry raised $7,553,542, which was 4% of the total money raised by Kerry in 2004.

Advertising and visits
Neither campaign advertised or visited this state during the fall election.

Analysis
Bush did win most of the counties in Maryland, but he lost the central part of the state (Washington DC suburbs and Baltimore), where most of the population is.  The middle section is very urban and includes a large number of African Americans, many of whom are affluent (specifically in the Democratic stronghold of Prince George's County). Bush dominated Western Maryland and the state's Eastern Shore, which are very rural, but he carried only two congressional districts (see below). However, Kerry's margin of victory was slightly less than in 2000, when Gore won by 16.39%. As of 2020, this marks the last time in which the Democratic candidate won less than 7 counties.  This also marks the only time since 1880 in which Maryland gave a majority of its vote to a candidate that lost both the popular and electoral vote.

Results

Results by county

Counties that flipped from Democratic to Republican
Somerset (largest town: Princess Anne)

By congressional district
Kerry won 6 of 8 congressional districts.

Electors

Technically the voters of Maryland cast their ballots for electors: representatives to the Electoral College. Maryland is allocated 10 electors because it has 8 congressional districts and 2 senators. All candidates who appear on the ballot or qualify to receive write-in votes must submit a list of 10 electors, who pledge to vote for their candidate and his or her running mate. Whoever wins the majority of votes in the state is awarded all 10 electoral votes. Their chosen electors then vote for president and vice president. Although electors are pledged to their candidate and running mate, they are not obligated to vote for them. An elector who votes for someone other than his or her candidate is known as a faithless elector.

The electors of each state and the District of Columbia met on December 13, 2004, to cast their votes for president and vice president. The Electoral College itself never meets as one body. Instead the electors from each state and the District of Columbia met in their respective capitols.

The following were the members of the Electoral College from the state. All 10 were pledged for Kerry/Edwards:
 Norman Conway
 Delores Kelley
 Lainey Lebow Sachs
 Pam Jackson
 Dorothy Chaney
 John Riley
 Wendy Fielde
 Daphne Bloomberg
 Tom Perez
 Gary Gensler

See also
 United States presidential elections in Maryland
 2004 United States presidential election
 2004 United States elections

References

External links
U.S. Election Atlas, Maryland results

Maryland
2004
Presidential